Leeds was, from 1894 to 1912, a rural district in the administrative county of Yorkshire, West Riding, England. It comprised an area adjacent to, but not including, the City of Leeds. It was alternatively known as the Rural District of Leeds (Roundhay and Seacroft).

Creation 

The district was formed by the Local Government Act 1894 as successor to the Leeds Rural Sanitary District. A directly elected rural district council (RDC) replaced the previous rural sanitary authority, which had consisted of the poor law guardians for the area. The district comprised the two parishes of Roundhay and Seacroft. The headquarters of the council lay outside the district at the Poor Law Offices, East Parade, in the County Borough of Leeds.

Abolition 
On 9 November 1912 the rural district was abolished when the boundaries of County Borough of Leeds were extended and the two parishes became part of the city.

References 

Districts of England created by the Local Government Act 1894
History of Leeds
Rural districts of the West Riding of Yorkshire